Prince Yormie Johnson (born 6 July 1952) is a Liberian politician and the current Senior Senator from Nimba County. A former rebel leader, Johnson played a prominent role in the First Liberian Civil War. Serving as leader of the Independent National Patriotic Front of Liberia, he captured, tortured and executed President Samuel Doe, who had himself overthrown and murdered the previous president William R. Tolbert Jr.

Early life 
Johnson was born in Tapeta, Nimba County, in the east-central interior of the country, and was brought up by an uncle in the capital city of Monrovia. In 1971, while living in Monrovia, he joined the Liberian National Guard (LNG), which was transformed into the Armed Forces of Liberia (AFL) in the aftermath of Samuel Doe's 1980 overthrow of President William R. Tolbert.

He rose to the rank of Lieutenant, receiving military training in both Liberia and the United States, where he was instructed in military police duties in South Carolina. A stern, often draconian, disciplinarian, he served as aide-de-camp to Gen. Thomas Quiwonkpa, the Commanding General of the Armed Forces of Liberia, and accompanied him into exile in 1983, after Quiwonkpa was accused of plotting a coup against Doe.

Liberia's civil war and warlordship 
Johnson later allied with Charles Taylor as part of the National Patriotic Front of Liberia (NPFL), serving as the NPFL's Chief Training Officer. Taylor's fighters crossed the border from Ivory Coast and began operations in Liberia on Christmas Eve, 1989.

Formation of the INPFL 
An internal power struggle resulted in Johnson breaking off from the Taylor-led NPFL and forming the Independent National Patriotic Front of Liberia (INPFL). Despite intervention in the civil war by the Economic Community of West African States Monitoring Group (ECOMOG), INPFL forces captured most of Monrovia in the late summer of 1990.

During the civil war, Johnson was notorious for killing anyone who opposed or criticised his actions. When Hare Krishna devotees, who were distributing food to starving people in Monrovia in the midst of the chaos of the civil war, sent him a letter begging him to stop killing people, he personally orchestrated the murder of Hladini devi dasi—born Linda Jury—and five of her students on the bank of the Saint Paul River on the night of Thursday, 13 September 1990.

Killing of President Doe 
On September 9, 1990, Johnson's supporters abducted President Samuel Doe from ECOMOG headquarters in the Monrovia port district. Doe was tortured and executed in Johnson's custody on 9 September, with the spectacle videotaped and broadcast around the world. The video showed Johnson sipping a Budweiser beer and being fanned by an assistant as his men cut off Doe's ear.

Johnson later denied killing Doe. Ahmadou Kourouma (who depicted Doe's assassination in his novel Allah Is Not Obliged) also accused Johnson of war crimes in the form of the abduction and torture of several Firestone executives.

Claim to power 
After Doe's death Johnson briefly claimed the presidency of Liberia. Johnson's claim to power ended following the consolidation of rebel power under Charles Taylor. In an attempt by the weak national government to reconstruct Liberian politics, the INPFL was recognised at a conference held in Guinea, where Amos Sawyer was elected president.

Flight to Nigeria 
Johnson was forced to flee to Nigeria to avoid capture by rebel forces supporting Taylor and was not involved in the Second Liberian Civil War.

While in Nigeria, Johnson became a Christian and reconciled with the Doe family through the intervention of Nigerian pastor T. B. Joshua.

Return and public office 
Johnson returned to Liberia in March 2004, following the resignation of Taylor as president and the installation of a transitional government. He stated his intention to return to politics, though he briefly left Liberia again on 7 April due to death threats he had received from the Liberians United for Reconciliation and Democracy (LURD) rebel group. In the 2005 general elections, Johnson contested and won a Senate seat representing Nimba County. For a period he served as the chair of the Senate's defence committee.

In the June 2009 final report of the Truth and Reconciliation Commission, which was established as part of the 2003 peace deal, the TRC recommended Johnson's inclusion on a list of 50 people who should be "specifically barred from holding public offices; elected or appointed for a period of thirty (30) years" for "being associated with former warring factions." Johnson labelled the recommendation a "joke," noting the absence of several other combatants from the list, and vowed to resist any charges brought as a result of the report.

In January 2011, the Supreme Court ruled in Williams v. Tah, a case brought by another person recommended for disqualification in the TRC report, that the TRC's recommendation was an unconstitutional violation of the listed individuals' right to procedural due process, and that it would be unconstitutional for the government to implement the proposed bans.

Johnson ran in Liberia's 2011 presidential election as the candidate of the newly formed National Union for Democratic Progress party. He placed third, with 11.6% of the vote; the election was won by the country's previous president, Ellen Johnson Sirleaf.

Footnotes

References

Further reading
Stephan Ellis, 'The Mask of Anarchy: The Destruction of Liberia and the Religious Dimension of an African Civil War’, Hurst & Company, London, 2001 – Introduction 'A Death in the Night' has an excellent account of Doe's death.
Alao, Mackinlay, and Olonisakin, Peacekeepers, Politicians, and Warlords, The Liberian Peace Process (Tokyo: United Nations University Press, 1999), 22.

External links
2011 Election campaign activities of Johnson in Nimba County, late 2010

1952 births
Living people
Members of the Senate of Liberia
People from Nimba County
Liberian rebels
African warlords
Liberian Christians
Converts to evangelical Christianity
Liberian expatriates in Nigeria
20th-century Liberian people
21st-century Liberian politicians